Phillip Thomas Salt (born 2 March 1979 in Huddersfield, Yorkshire, England), is an English footballer who played as a midfielder in the Football League.

Honours

Club
Leigh RMI
Lancashire FA Challenge Trophy (1): 2002−03

References

External links

Phil Salt at OldhamAthletic.co.uk

1979 births
Living people
English footballers
Footballers from Huddersfield
Association football midfielders
Oldham Athletic A.F.C. players
Leigh Genesis F.C. players
Scarborough F.C. players
Hyde United F.C. players
Radcliffe F.C. players
English Football League players
National League (English football) players
Northern Premier League players